Comedy Firsts is a short-lived British television series consisting of five unrelated sitcoms and one sketch show that aired in 1995. Two of the episodes later led to full series, Barbara and Sometime, Never.

Background
Comedy Firsts followed on from ITV's Comedy Playhouse that had aired in 1993. It followed the same format of a series of one-off comedy pilots. Each episode of Comedy Firsts aired on Monday at 8pm and had a different cast and writers.

Episodes

References
Mark Lewisohn, Radio Times Guide to TV Comedy, BBC Worldwide Ltd, 2003
Comedy Firsts at British TV Comedy

1995 British television series debuts
1995 British television series endings
1990s British comedy television series
ITV comedy
Television pilot seasons
Television series by ITV Studios
English-language television shows